Beata Żbikowska (born 16 April 1934) is a Polish middle-distance runner. She competed in the women's 800 metres at the 1960 Summer Olympics.

References

1934 births
Living people
Athletes (track and field) at the 1960 Summer Olympics
Polish female middle-distance runners
Olympic athletes of Poland
People from Susz
Sportspeople from Warmian-Masurian Voivodeship
Zawisza Bydgoszcz athletes